Hatch Outcrop is an outcropping of rocks close northward of Peeler Bluff in the western part of McNamara Island, Antarctica. The island lies within the northern part of the Abbot Ice Shelf. The outcrop was named by the Advisory Committee on Antarctic Names for Lieutenant Ross Hatch, U.S. Navy, who assisted in obtaining position data at this outcrop, February 7, 1961.

References

Rock formations of Ellsworth Land